Waiting for Daylight is the third album and second studio album by the Danish dance/pop act Infernal, released in 2000 in Denmark. It was later released as Muzaik in 2001, with a more pop music-oriented sound and a few bonus tracks.

Track listing

Singles

References

Infernal (Danish band) albums
2000 albums